Craig McIntyre Wright (born 28 April 1974) is a Scottish former cricketer. He was a big hitting right-handed middle order batsman and right-arm medium pace bowler. He was educated at Kelvinside Academy in Glasgow.

Career
Wright had represented Scotland at both Under 16 and Under 19 level before making his senior debut in a match against Ireland on 9 August 1997. He went on to play 194 times for Scotland, including the 2007 Cricket World Cup, and 20/20 World Cup in 2007 & 2009. He overtook Greig Williamson in 2006 as the highest capped Scottish player. Career highlights include a hat trick against Denmark in 2004 and a man of the match performance to help Scotland upset Worcestershire in a 1998 NatWest series match. He was also Scotland's outstanding player of their first season in the English National Cricket League in 2003 (25 wickets at an average of 19.84) and topped the tournament bowling averages (16 wickets at 13.68) in Scotland's failed bid to qualify from the ICC World Cup qualifier in 2009 .

In 2002 he was appointed captain of the national side, a role he kept until stepping down at the end of the 2007 World Cup. As captain he lifted the 2004 Intercontinental Cup and the 2005 ICC Trophy for Scotland as well as steering them to the final of the ICC World League Division 1 (which qualified the team for the 2007 20/20 World Cup). In total he captained Scotland a record 107 times.

After being omitted from the Scottish side for the 1999 World Cup despite a strong showing the previous season, he had to wait until 2006 to make his One Day International debut. In his second ODI game, against the Netherlands, he hit Tim de Leede for six off the penultimate delivery to win the game. This effort was repeated against Ireland in the 2007 World League with Wright striking a six to level scores with two balls to go before hitting the winning boundary off the final delivery. Following Scotland's removal from the 2009 ICC Twenty20 Championship, Wright, then 35, announced his retirement.

Off the field he juggled his playing career with the job of Cricket Scotland's Performance Development Manager, having previously served as their Development Officer and Marketing Manager. He refocused his career on this role following his retirement as a player.

In April 2010 it was announced that Wright would be joining Edinburgh-based Watsonian Cricket Club after leaving Greenock. He captained an MCC team that toured Bermuda in  September–October  2011, playing 10 one-day matches.

References

External links

Scotland One Day International cricketers
Scottish cricket captains
Scotland Twenty20 International cricketers
Living people
1974 births
Scottish cricketers
People educated at Kelvinside Academy
Cricketers at the 1998 Commonwealth Games
Sportspeople from Paisley, Renfrewshire
Scottish cricket coaches
Coaches of the Scotland national cricket team
Commonwealth Games competitors for Scotland